Hosoi Bros are an American party thrash band from Memphis, Tennessee. Since 2010 they have shared stages with Red Fang, the Sword, Torche, Skeletonwitch, Truckfighters, Lord Dying, Gypsyhawk, Eye, and more. They have two 7" singles and a full-length LP out.

History
The group formed in 2010. They were featured in the  October 2013 issue of Decibel. They performed at the 2013 South by Southwest music festival.

Members
Severin 
Apple
Jimmy James Blasingame
E-Rock

Discography
Wine Witch 7"
Snorlokk 7"
Abuse Your Allusion III LP

Videography
"Snorlokk" (2012)
"Wine Witch" (2012)
"Hands of Stone" (2015)
"Lights Out" (2016)

References

 

American stoner rock musical groups
Musical groups from Memphis, Tennessee
Musical groups established in 2010
Musical quartets
Punk rock groups from Tennessee
Heavy metal musical groups from Tennessee
2010 establishments in Tennessee